Senator Stenehjem may refer to:

Bob Stenehjem (1952–2011), North Dakota State Senate
Wayne Stenehjem (born 1953), North Dakota State Senate